Kemp's ridley sea turtle (Lepidochelys kempii), also called the Atlantic ridley sea turtle, is the rarest species of sea turtle and is the world's most endangered species of sea turtle. It is one of two living species in the genus Lepidochelys (the other one being L. olivacea, the olive ridley sea turtle).

Taxonomy
This species of turtle is called Kemp's ridley because Richard Moore Kemp (1825–1908) of Key West was the first to send a specimen to Samuel Garman at Harvard, but the origin of the name "ridley" itself is unknown. Prior to the term being popularly used (for both species in the genus), L. kempii at least was known as the "bastard turtle".

At least one source also refers to Kemp's ridley as a "heartbreak turtle". In her book The Great Ridley Rescue, Pamela Philips claimed the name was coined by fishermen who witnessed the turtles dying after being "turned turtle" (on their backs). The fishermen said the turtles "died of a broken heart".

Description
Kemp's ridley is  the smallest of all sea turtle species, reaching maturity at  carapace length and weighing only . Typical of sea turtles, it has a dorsoventrally depressed body with specially adapted flipper-like front limbs and a  beak. The adult's oval carapace is almost as wide as it is long and is usually olive-gray in color. The carapace has five pairs of costal scutes. In each bridge adjoining the plastron to the carapace are four inframarginal scutes, each of which is perforated by a pore. The head has two pairs of prefrontal scales.

These turtles change color as they mature. As hatchlings, they are almost entirely a dark purple on both sides, but mature adults have a yellow-green or white plastron and a grey-green carapace.

Kemp's ridley has a triangular-shaped head with a somewhat hooked beak with large crushing surfaces. The skull is similar to that of the olive ridley. Unlike other sea turtles, the surface on the squamosal bone where the jaw opening muscles originate, faces to the side rather than to the back.

They are the only sea turtles that nest during the day.

Distribution

The distribution of L. kempii is somewhat usual compared to most reptiles, varying significantly among  adults and juveniles, as well as males and females. Adults primarily live in the Gulf of Mexico, where they forage in the relatively shallow waters of the continental shelf (up to 409 m deep, but typically 50 m or less), with females ranging from the southern coast of the Florida Peninsula to the northern coast of the Yucatán Peninsula, while males have a tendency to remain closer to the nesting beaches in the Western Gulf waters of Texas (USA), Tamaulipas, and Veracruz (Mexico). Adults of L. kempii are rarely found outside of the Gulf of Mexico and only 2-4% from the Atlantic are adults.

Juveniles and subadults, in contrast, regularly migrate into the Atlantic Ocean and occupy the coastal waters of the continental shelf of North America from southern Florida to Cape Cod, Massachusetts, and occasionally northward. Accidental and vagrant records are known with some regularity from throughout the northern Atlantic Ocean and Mediterranean Sea, where the Gulf Stream is believed to play a significant role in their dispersal. Confirmed records from Newfoundland to Venezuela in the west; to Ireland, the Netherlands, Malta in the Mediterranean, and numerous localities in between are known in the east, although  more than 95% of these involve juveniles or subadults. Several reports from the African coast from Morocco to Cameroon involve unverified specimens and may include misidentified L. olivacea.

In November 2021 a male was found alive on Talacre beach in North Wales. The turtle was taken to the Anglesey Sea Zoo for treatment, with the intent of eventual transportation back to the Gulf of Mexico.

Feeding and life history

Feeding
Kemp's ridley turtle feeds on mollusks, crustaceans, jellyfish, fish, algae or seaweed, and sea urchins. Juveniles primarily feed on crabs.

Life history
Most females return each year to a single beach—Rancho Nuevo in the Mexican state of Tamaulipas—to lay eggs. The females arrive in large groups of hundreds or thousands in nesting aggregations called arribadas, which is a Spanish word for "arrivals".

Juvenile turtles tend to live in floating sargassum seaweed beds for their first years. Then, they range between northwest Atlantic waters and the Gulf of Mexico while growing into maturity.

They reach sexual maturity at the age of 10–12.

This is the only species that nests primarily during the day.
The nesting season for these turtles is April to August. They nest mostly (95%) on a 16-mile beach in the Mexican state of Tamaulipas and on Padre Island in the US state of Texas, and elsewhere on the Gulf Coast. They mate offshore. Gravid females land in groups on beaches in arribadas or mass nesting. They prefer areas with dunes, or secondarily, swamps. The estimated number of nesting females in 1947 was 89,000, but shrank to an estimated 7,702 by 1985. Females nest one to four times during a season, keeping 10 to 20 days between nestings. Incubation takes 6-8 weeks. Around 100 eggs are in a clutch. The hatchlings' sex is decided by the temperature in the area during incubation. If the temperature is below 29.5 °C, the offspring will be mainly male.

Conservation

Egg harvesting and poaching first depleted the numbers of Kemp's ridley sea turtles, but today, major threats include habitat loss, pollution, and entanglement in shrimping nets.

Efforts to protect L. kempii began in 1966, when Mexico's Instituto Nacional de Investigaciones Biologico-Pesqueras (National Institute of Biological-Fisheries Research) sent biologists Hunberto Chávez, Martin Contreras, and Eduardo Hernondez to the coast of southern Tamaulipas, to survey and instigate conservation plans. Kemp's ridley turtle was first listed under the Endangered Species Conservation Act of 1970 on December 2, 1970, and subsequently under the Endangered Species Act of 1973. In 1977, an informal, binational, multiagency, the Kemp's Ridley Working Group, first met to develop a recovery plan. A binational recovery plan was developed in 1984, and revised in 1992. A draft public review draft of the second revision was published by National Marine Fisheries Service in March 2010. This revision includes an updated threat assessment.

One mechanism used to protect turtles from fishing nets is the turtle excluder device (TED). Because the biggest danger to the population of Kemp's ridley sea turtles is shrimp trawls, the TED is attached to the shrimp trawl. It is a grid of bars with an opening at the top or bottom, fitted into the neck of the shrimp trawl. It allows small animals to slip through the bars and be caught while larger animals, such as sea turtles, strike the bars and are ejected, thus avoiding possible drowning.

In September 2007, Corpus Christi, Texas, wildlife officials found a record of 128 Kemp's ridley sea turtle nests on Texas beaches, including 81 on North Padre Island (Padre Island National Seashore) and four on Mustang Island.  The figure was exceeded in each of the following 7 years (see graph to 2013, provisional figures for 2014 as at July, 118.). Wildlife officials released 10,594 Kemp's ridley hatchlings along the Texas coast that year. The turtles are popular in Mexico, as raw material for leather and as food.

In July 2020, five rehabilitated turtles were released back in to Cape Cod with satellite tracking devices to monitor their wellbeing. A 2020 rescue mission to save 30 turtles from the freezing seas of Cape Cod was delayed by weather and technical issues, spurring a temporary rescue mission en route between Massachusetts and New Mexico. The Tennessee Aquarium offered overnight shelter and care, and the turtles were eventually released to the sea.

Oil spills
Some Kemp's ridleys were airlifted from Mexico after the 1979 blowout of the Ixtoc 1 rig, which spilled millions of gallons of oil into the Gulf of Mexico.

Since April 30, 2010, 10 days after the accident on the Deepwater Horizon, 156 sea turtle deaths were recorded; most were Kemp's ridleys.  Louisiana Department of Wildlife and Fisheries biologists and enforcement agents rescued Kemp's ridleys in Grand Isle.  Most of the 456 oiled turtles that were rescued, cleaned, and released by the US Fish and Wildlife Service were Kemp's ridleys.

Of the endangered marine species frequenting Gulf waters, only Kemp's ridley relies on the region as its sole breeding ground.

As part of the effort to save the species from some of the effects of the Deepwater Horizon oil spill, scientists took nests and incubated them elsewhere; 67 eggs were collected from a nest along the Florida Panhandle on June 26, 2010, and brought to a temperature-controlled warehouse at NASA's Kennedy Space Center, where 56 hatched, and 22 were released on 11 July 2010.

The overall plan was to collect eggs from about 700 sea turtle nests, incubate them, and release the young on beaches across Alabama and Florida over a period of months.  Eventually, 278 nests were collected, including only a few Kemp's ridley nests.

References

Further reading

Garman S. (1800). On certain Species of Chelonioidæ. Bull. Mus. Comp. Zool., Harvard College 6 (6): 123–126. (Thalassochelys kempii, new species, pp. 123–124).
  Database entry includes a brief justification of why this species is critically endangered and the criteria used

External links 

Profile from the OBIS-SEAMAP project of the Ocean Biogeographic Information System
Turtle Trax.org: Kemp's ridley sea turtle Profile 
Coastal Research and Education Society of Long Island wiki Information on Kemp's ridley sea turtle
Information from the Florida Fish and Wildlife Conservation Commission
Texas Parks & Wildlife Dept. — Kemp's ridley sea turtle

Lepidochelys
Sea turtles
Turtles of North America
Reptiles of Mexico
Reptiles of the United States
Reptiles of the Caribbean
Fauna of the Southeastern United States
Biota of the Gulf of Mexico
Critically endangered animals
Critically endangered biota of Mexico
Critically endangered fauna of the United States
ESA endangered species
Reptiles described in 1880
Articles containing video clips